Eskil Kinneberg (born 17 May 1992) is a Norwegian orienteer.

Career
At the 2017 World Orienteering Championships in Tartu, Estonia, he placed fifth in the long distance, eighth in the middle distance, and won a gold medal in the relay (with Olav Lundanes and Magne Dæhli).

He won a gold medal in the middle distance at the 2018 World Orienteering Championships in Latvia, ahead of Daniel Hubmann and Florian Howald. This was Kinneberg's first individual world championships medal. He was also part of the Norwegian gold-winning relay team at the 2018 World Championships, running the second leg, with Gaute Hallan Steiwer running the first leg, and Magne Dæhli the third.

World Championship results

References

External links

1992 births
Living people
Norwegian orienteers
Foot orienteers
World Orienteering Championships medalists
Norwegian expatriates in Sweden
Junior World Orienteering Championships medalists